Skalborg is a southern neighbourhood of Aalborg.

"City Syd", a large shopping center, and Skalborg Sportsklub with Football, Handball, Badminton and Table tennis are located in Skalborg.

Skalborg is served by Skalborg railway station, located on the Randers–Aalborg railway line.

Neighbourhoods in Aalborg
Towns and settlements in Aalborg Municipality